Mitotic spindle assembly checkpoint protein MAD2B is a protein that in humans is encoded by the MAD2L2 gene.

Function 
MAD2L2 is a component of the mitotic spindle assembly checkpoint that prevents the onset of anaphase until all chromosomes are properly aligned at the metaphase plate.  MAD2L2 is a homolog of MAD2L1.

Interactions 
MAD2L2 has been shown to interact with:
 ADAM9,
 MAD2L1,
 REV1,  and
 REV3L.

References

Further reading